Montxo Armendariz (born as Juan Ramón Armendariz Barrios; 27 January 1949 in Olleta, Navarra, Spain) It was part of a popular trend  of Spanish films focused in youth problems that it was falling out of favor by the time this film was released. Nevertheless 27 Hours won the Silver Shell at the San Sebastián International Film Festival. 

In 1990, Armendáriz returned to the ethnographic style of his first film with: Las Cartas de Alou (Letters from Alou), a narrative that follows a Senegalese black young man who arrives in Spain as an illegal immigrant and has to confront personal and institutional discrimination.  Well received by film critics, Las Cartas de Alou won the Golden Shell as best film at the San Sebastian film festival and Armendáriz received a Goya Award  and the Spanish guild award of film writers in the original screenplay category.

Armendáriz reached wide popular success with his third film Historias del Kronen (1995) Stories from the Kronen, about  alienated upper class young friends in Madrid, who regularly meet at the bar that gives the film its title.  It was adapted from a novel by José Angel Mañas in an Elias Querejeta's production. The film, starring Juan Diego Botto and Jordi Mollà, follows two close friends filling their summer vacation with sex, drugs and rock. The film became emblematic of the Spanish young generation of the 1990s. 

Armendáriz subsequent film became his best regarded artistic success Secretos del Corazon (Secrets of the Heart) (1997). An intimist drama that centers on Javi, a nine-year-old boy who while visiting relatives in rural Navarre during the early 1960s discovers the world of the adults. The film reflected the director's own nostalgic views of his childhood in the Navarrese countryside, portraying with sensibility the growing up of the child. Secretos del Corazon received a number of awards and was Spain's candidate to the Academy Awards in the foreign language film category that year. 
  
In 1999 Armendáriz founded his own production company Oria films with Pui Oria. Two years later he directed his next film Silencio Roto (Broken Silence),  a story about Maquis, the guerilla fighters that confronted the Francoist forces in the aftermath of the Spanish civil war.

The director's subsequent project was a return  to his origins as a documentarist, making  Escenario Movil  (2004)  which follows the itinerant  life of a musician  through different musical venues.

A year later Armendáriz directed Obaba (2005), a fragmented tale  based on the compilation of short stories book Obabakoak written by Bernardo Atxaga. Armendáriz most recent film  No tengas  miedo (Don't be afraid) (2011)  stars Michelle Jenner as Silvia a young woman confronting her past as an abused child.

At Gijón International Film Festival in 2011, he received the Nacho Martinez Award.

Filmography as director

Notes

References 
 D'Lugo, Marvin.  Guide to the Cinema of Spain. Greenwood Press, 1997. 
 Stone, Rob. Spanish Cinema. Pearson Education, 2002, 
 Torres, Augusto M. Diccionario Espasa Cine Español. Espasa Calpe, 1994, 

1949 births
Living people
People from Tafalla (comarca)
Basque-language writers
Spanish film directors
Spanish male screenwriters
Basque film directors
20th-century Spanish screenwriters
20th-century Spanish male writers
21st-century Spanish screenwriters